The city of Rome harbours thirteen ancient obelisks, the most in the world. There are eight ancient Egyptian and five ancient Roman obelisks in Rome, together with a number of more modern obelisks; there was also until 2005 an ancient Ethiopian obelisk in Rome.

The Romans used special heavy cargo carriers called obelisk ships to transport the monuments down the Nile to Alexandria and from there across the Mediterranean Sea to Rome. On site, large Roman cranes were employed to erect the monoliths.

Ancient Egyptian obelisks

At least eight obelisks created in antiquity by the Egyptians were taken from Egypt after the Roman conquest and brought to Rome.

Ancient Roman obelisks

At least five obelisks were manufactured in Egypt in the Roman period at the request of the wealthy Romans, or made in Rome as copies of ancient Egyptian originals.

Obelisk of Axum 

There was also an Ethiopian obelisk in Rome, the Obelisk of Axum, 24 m, placed in the Piazza di Porta Capena. It had been taken from Axum by the Italian Army during the Italian occupation of Ethiopia in 1937. It was struck by lightning in May 2002. After being restored, it was cut into three pieces and returned to Ethiopia in April 2005.

Modern obelisks 

There are five well-known modern obelisks in Rome:
 Villa Medici, 19th century copy of the original, found in the gardens and taken to Florence.
 Two obelisks in the Villa Torlonia, 1842, Baveno granite
 Foro Italico, 1932, 17.5 m, Carrara marble, originally dedicated to Benito Mussolini, and inscribed Mussolini Dux
 Marconi, 1959, 45 m, in the centre of the EUR district, dedicated to Guglielmo Marconi, built for the 1960 Summer Olympics. 92 panels in white marble contain illustrations of Marconi's career and allegorical scenes.

Former locations of some obelisks 
  Lateranense at Karnak, Egypt: 
  Lateranense at Circus Maximus in Rome: 

  Vaticano at Forum Iulium in Alexandria, Egypt: 
  Vaticano at Vatican Circus in Rome: 

  Flaminio at Heliopolis, Egypt: 
  Flaminio at Circus Maximus in Rome: 

  Solare at Heliopolis, Egypt: 
  Solare at Campus Martius in Rome:

See also 
 List of Egyptian obelisks
 List of modern obelisks

Monoliths
 Cleopatra's Needle
 List of Roman monoliths
 List of largest monoliths in the world

Roman triumphal monuments
 List of Roman triumphal arches
 List of Roman victory columns

Notes

References

Further reading

External links 
 A Google map showing the location of all the obelisks in Rome

 Obelisks in Rome (Andrea Pollett)
 Obelisks of Rome (series of articles in Platner's Topographical Dictionary of Ancient Rome)
 Obelischi di Roma
 Obelisk of Psametik II and Augustus, erected by Pope Pius VI in Piazza Montecitorio

 Romeartlover.it: Obelisks of Rome

 
Rome
Obelisks 
Augustan building projects
Obelisks
Egyptology
Stone monuments and memorials
Tourist attractions in Rome
Obelisks
Rome Obelisks
Obelisks
Rome
Obelisks in Rome